Basket Case may refer to:

Books
The Basket Case, novel by Ralph McInerny
 Basket Case (novel), a 2002 crime novel by Carl Hiaasen

Film and TV
 Basket Case (film), a 1982 American comedy horror film by Frank Henenlotter

Music
 "Basket Case" (song), a 1994 song by Green Day
 "Basketcase", a 1994 song by Compulsion
 "Basket Case", a song by Danger Doom from their 2005 album, The Mouse and the Mask
 "Basket Case", a song by Sara Bareilles from her 2010 album, Kaleidoscope Heart
 "Basket Case", a song by Warren Zevon from his 2002 album, My Ride's Here